Michael Andrew Wells (born 9 April 1960) is an American businessman. He was the chief executive of Prudential plc, a British multinational life insurance and financial services company, from 2015 to 2022. Wells joined Athora, a European savings and retirement group, in July 2022, where he is Group CEO.

Early life
Wells graduated from San Diego State University with a Bachelor of Science degree.

Career
After graduating, he spent ten years working for a variety of financial services firms in the US, including Wood Logan, Smith Barney, McGinness & Associates and Dean Witter.

Wells joined the Prudential Group in 1995 as president of Jackson National Life Distributors, part of the Group's US arm, Jackson National Life. He spent 20 years in a variety of senior positions at Jackson. He was appointed as Jackson's CEO in January 2011, at which time he also joined the board of Prudential, Jackson's UK-based parent company.

During Wells's four-year tenure as CEO of Jackson, it became the largest seller of variable annuities in the US.

In June 2015, Wells succeeded Tidjane Thiam (who left to become CEO of Credit Suisse), on a pay package worth up to £7.5 million. In March 2016, he announced Prudential's first full-year results since taking over as CEO, showing that the group made operating profits of £4billion in 2015, 22 per cent higher than the year before. He sought to reassure shareholders over business in Asia, and China in particular in 2016. "I think China and Asia in general are misread by the West," he told CNBC. "The consumers have money, are spending...all of the key metrics around our average client are very resilient.".

In April 2017, Wells was voted number one insurance CEO in Institutional Investor 2017 All-Europe Executive Team rankings.

In April 2018, Wells became a member of the International Advisory Panel of the Monetary Authority of Singapore.

In March 2018, Wells announced that M&GPrudential was to be demerged from the Group; the demerger was completed on 21 October 2019.

Wells retired as CEO of Prudential on 31 March 2022.

In July 2022, Wells joined Athora, a leading European savings and retirement services group, where he is Group CEO. His appointment at Athora was confirmed in September 2022 following the receipt of regulatory approvals.

Personal life
Wells was born in Canada but has US citizenship. He is married with two adult sons. Wells owns a Tennessee cattle ranch and collects Gibson guitars.

References

1960 births
Living people
American chief executives
Place of birth missing (living people)
San Diego State University alumni
Prudential plc people